Xerox Daybreak (also Xerox 6085 PCS, Xerox 1186) is a workstation computer marketed by Xerox from 1985 to 1989.

Overview

Daybreak is the final release in the D* (pronounced D-Star) series of machines, some of which share the Wildflower CPU design by Butler Lampson. Machines in this series include, in order, Dolphin, Dorado, Dicentra, Dandelion, Dandetiger, Daybreak, the never-manufactured Daisy, and Dragonfly "a 4-processor VLSI CPU developed at PARC and intended for a high-end printing system".

It was sold as the Xerox 6085 PCS (Professional Computer System) or Viewpoint 6085 PCS when sold as an office workstation running the Viewpoint system. Viewpoint is based on the Star software originally developed for the Xerox Star.  The 6085 ran the ViewPoint (later GlobalView) GUI and was used extensively throughout Xerox until being replaced by Suns and  PCs. Although years ahead of its time, it was never a commercial success.  The proprietary closed architecture and Xerox's reluctance to release the Mesa development environment for general use stifled any third-party development.

A fully configured 6085 came with an 80MB hard disk, 3.7MB of RAM, a 5¼-inch floppy disk drive, an Ethernet controller, and a PC emulator card containing an 80186 CPU. The basic system comes with 1.1MB of RAM and a 10MB hard disk.

The Daybreak was also sold as a Xerox 1186 workstation when configured as a Lisp machine.

References

External links
 OLD-COMPUTERS.COM: Museum: Xerox 6085

Daybreak
Computer workstations
Products introduced in 1985